This article contains lists of achievements in major cycling competitions according to first-place, second-place and third-place results obtained by cyclists representing different nations. The objective is not to create combined medal tables; the focus is on listing the best positions achieved by cyclists in major international competitions, ranking the nations according to the most podiums accomplished by cyclists of these nations. All major World Championships organized by Union Cycliste Internationale (International Cycling Union, UCI) are covered, as well as cycling events at the Olympic Games.

Results 

For the making of the list, results from major senior-level international UCI World Championships and the cycling events at the Summer Olympics were consulted. Junior and under-23 events at the UCI World Championships were not taken into account. Results obtained by amateur athletes, or in amateur events, were considered for the list.

The conventions used on this table are: 

 Road for road events at the Summer Olympics and the UCI Road World Championships
 Track for track events at the Summer Olympics and the UCI Track Cycling World Championships
 MTB for mountain bike events at the Summer Olympics
 BMX for BMX events at the Summer Olympics and the UCI BMX World Championships
 MTB&T for mountain bike events at the UCI Mountain Bike World Championships and the UCI Trials World Championships
 XCM for events held at the UCI Mountain Bike Marathon World Championships
 Urban for events held at the UCI Urban Cycling World Championships
 Cross for events held at the UCI Cyclo-cross World Championships
 Indoor for events held at the UCI Indoor Cycling World Championships

Events held at the UCI Motor-paced World Championships were counted as part of road events. Four-cross events were counted as part of the Mountain Bike and Trials World Championships (MTB&T). Indoor results comprise all artistic events as well as cycle ball events.

The following World Championships were not considered for this list:

 UCI B World Championships
 UCI Juniors World Championships
 UCI Junior Road World Championships
 UCI Junior Track World Championships
 UCI Para-cycling Track World Championships
 UCI Para-cycling Road World Championships

The table is pre-sorted by total number of first-place results, second-place results and third-place results, respectively. When equal ranks are given, nations are listed in alphabetical order. Defunct National Olympic Committees (NOCs) or historical teams are shown in italics.

Also, it is important to note that official documents from UCI credit a medal at the 1984 UCI Track Cycling World Championships to Zhou Suying as a medal for North Korea, while in reality Syuing represented China. Cyclists from North Korea have never earned medals at the UCI World Championships, and this is reflected on this list.

References 

Cycling competitions
Cycling-related lists
Cycling
Achievements